The Sverdrup balance, or Sverdrup relation, is a theoretical relationship between the wind stress exerted on the surface of the open ocean and the vertically integrated meridional (north-south) transport of ocean water.

History 

Aside from the oscillatory motions associated with tidal flow, there are two primary causes of large scale flow in the ocean: (1) thermohaline processes, which induce motion by introducing changes at the surface in temperature and salinity, and therefore in seawater density, and (2) wind forcing.  In the 1940s, when Harald Sverdrup was thinking about calculating the gross features of ocean circulation, he chose to consider exclusively the wind stress component of the forcing.  As he says in his 1947 paper, in which he presented the Sverdrup relation, this is probably the more important of the two. After making the assumption that frictional dissipation is negligible, Sverdrup obtained the simple result that the meridional mass transport (the Sverdrup transport) is proportional to the curl of the wind stress.  This is known as the Sverdrup relation;

.

Here,

 is the rate of change of the Coriolis parameter, f, with meridional distance;
V is the vertically integrated meridional mass transport including the geostrophic interior mass transport and the Ekman mass transport;
k is the unit vector in the z (vertical) direction;
 is the wind stress vector.

Physical interpretation 

Sverdrup balance may be thought of as a consistency relationship for flow which is dominated
by the Earth's rotation. Such flow will be characterized by weak rates of spin compared
to that of the earth.
Any parcel at rest with respect to the surface of the earth must match the spin of the earth underneath it. Looking down on the earth at the north pole, this spin is in a counterclockwise direction, which is defined as positive rotation or vorticity. At the south pole it is in a clockwise direction, corresponding to negative rotation.  Thus to move a parcel of fluid from the south to the north without causing it to spin, it is necessary to add sufficient (positive)
rotation so as to keep it matched with the rotation of the earth underneath it. The left-hand side of 
the Sverdrup equation represents the motion required to maintain this match between the absolute vorticity of a water column and the planetary vorticity, while
the right represents the applied force of the wind.

Derivation 

The Sverdrup relation can be derived from the linearized barotropic vorticity equation for steady motion:

.

In words, this equation says that as a vertical column of water is squashed, it moves toward the Equator; as it is stretched, it moves toward the pole. Assuming, as did Sverdrup, that there is a level below which motion ceases, the vorticity equation can be integrated from this level to the base of the Ekman surface layer to obtain:

,

The driving force behind the vertical velocity  is the Ekman transport, which in the Northern (Southern) hemisphere is to the right (left) of the wind stress; thus a stress field with a positive (negative) curl leads to Ekman divergence (convergence), and water must rise from beneath to replace the old Ekman layer water.  The expression for this Ekman pumping velocity is

,

which, when combined with the previous equation and adding the Ekman transport, yields the Sverdrup relation.

Further development 

In 1948 Henry Stommel proposed a circulation for the entire ocean depth by starting with the same equations as Sverdrup but adding bottom friction, and showed that the variation in Coriolis parameter with latitude results in a narrow western boundary current in ocean basins. Walter Munk in 1950 combined the results of Rossby (eddy viscosity), Sverdrup (upper ocean wind driven flow) and Stommel (western boundary current flow) and proposed a complete solution for the ocean circulation.

References

External links 
 Glossary of Physical Oceanography and Related Disciplines Sverdrup balance 

Ocean currents
Physical oceanography